Kamal Khatri is a Nepali singer, songwriter and composer. His career began upon participating in the Radio show called Adhunik song competition of Radio Nepal in 2005. He is known as one of the best adhunik (modern) pop singers of Nepal.

About
He is currently one of the busiest musicians in Nepali music industry. His some Popular Songs are “Jaula Relaima”, “Aatma ma”, “Pahilo Maya”, “Fikka Fikka”.

List of songs by Kamal Khatri

References

External links

songs list by Kamal Khatri
Interview, along with Priyanka Karki Interview on Himalaya TV

21st-century Nepalese male singers
Living people
Year of birth missing (living people)
People from Hetauda
Nepalese playback singers